David Charles Brundage (born October 6, 1964 in Portland, Oregon) is an American professional baseball manager. In , Brundage spent his first season as manager of the  Sacramento River Cats, Triple-A affiliate of the San Francisco Giants.

His debut season with Sacramento, his first in the Giants' organization, marked Brundage's 12th consecutive season as a manager at the Triple-A level and 20th year as a skipper in the  minor leagues. Previously, he spent four seasons (2013–16) at the helm of the Lehigh Valley IronPigs in the Philadelphia Phillies' organization. He led the 2016 IronPigs to an 85–58 record, the second-best mark in Triple-A.

Brundage attended McKay High School in Salem, Oregon, and Oregon State University. He was selected by the Phillies in the fourth round of the 1986 Major League Baseball draft but never reached the Major League Baseball (MLB). Primarily an outfielder—although he appeared in 39 games as a pitcher—his playing career lasted for eight seasons in the Philadelphia and Seattle Mariners' organizations. He had been traded along with Glenn Wilson and Mike Jackson from the Phillies to the Mariners for Phil Bradley and Tim Fortugno at the Winter Meetings on December 9, 1987. He batted .275 with 683 hits and compiled a 1–5 won/lost mark on the mound with an earned run average of 3.83.

His managerial career began in the Seattle organization in 1995 in the California League, but he has spent much of his career at higher levels of the minors, including six years at Double-A with Seattle affiliates in the Southern and Texas leagues, and 11 seasons at Triple-A with the Tacoma Rainiers (2006), Richmond/Gwinnett Braves (2007–12), and the IronPigs. His 2007 Richmond team won the International League championship. He also was Tacoma's batting coach from 1998–2000.

His 19-season win–loss record as a manager through 2016 was 1,371–1,315 (.510).

References

External links

 Gwinnett Braves' official biography

1964 births
Living people
American expatriate baseball players in Canada
Baseball players from Portland, Oregon
Calgary Cannons players
Clearwater Phillies players
Lehigh Valley IronPigs managers
Oregon State Beavers baseball players
People from Keizer, Oregon
Reading Phillies players
San Antonio Missions managers
Spartanburg Phillies players
Tacoma Rainiers players
Vermont Mariners players
Williamsport Bills players